Luke Gingras is a paralympic athlete from Canada competing mainly in category TW3 wheelchair racing events.

Luke competed in just the marathon at his first Paralympics in Seoul in 1988 Summer Paralympics.  In 1992 he competed in the 100m, 400m and Marathon as well as winning bronze medals in the 200m and 800m and a silver as part of the German 4 × 400 m relay team.

References

Paralympic track and field athletes of Canada
Athletes (track and field) at the 1988 Summer Paralympics
Athletes (track and field) at the 1992 Summer Paralympics
Paralympic silver medalists for Canada
Paralympic bronze medalists for Canada
Living people
Medalists at the 1992 Summer Paralympics
Year of birth missing (living people)
Paralympic medalists in athletics (track and field)
Canadian male wheelchair racers